This is a list of Members of Parliament (MPs) elected in the 1865 general election.

List

References

See also 

 UK general election, 1865
 List of parliaments of the United Kingdom

1865
UK MPs 1865–1868
1865-related lists
1865 United Kingdom general election